The Lenoir–Rhyne Bears football program is the intercollegiate American football team for Lenoir–Rhyne University located in the U.S. state of North Carolina. The team competes in the NCAA Division II and are members of the South Atlantic Conference. Lenoir–Rhyne's first football team was fielded in 1907. The team plays its home games at the 10,000 seat Moretz Stadium in Hickory, North Carolina.

History

Conference history
1954–1969: NAIA
1970–1992: NAIA Division I
1989–present: NCAA Division II

Conference affiliations
1907–1930: Independent
1931–1960: North State Conference
1961–1974: Carolinas Conference
1975–present: South Atlantic Conference
The Bears had no team from 1912–1920 and 1942–1945.

Bowl games
The Bears have participated in five postseason bowl games, compiling a 3–2 record.

Coaches
Clarence Stasavich has the most victories as coach of the Bears.
 T. M. Warlick (1907–1908)
 B. H. Shoaf (1909)
 D. M. Williams (1910–1911)
 Phil Utley (1921)
 Norman Lamotte (1922–1923)
 Dick Gurley (1924–1931)
 Robert M. Shores (1932–1936)
 Albert Spurlock (1937)
 Robert M. Shores (1938–1941)
 D. M. Williams (1942–1945)
 Clarence Stasavich (1946–1961)
 Hanley Painter (1962–1972)
 Danny Williams (1973)
 Jack Huss (1974–1979)
 Henry Vansant (1980–1983)
 John Perry (1984–1990)
 Charles Forbes (1991–1996)
 Bill Hart (1997–2001)
 Wayne Hicks (2002–2006)
 Fred Goldsmith (2007–2010)
 Mike Houston (2011–2013)
 Ian Shields (2014–2015)
 Mike Kellar (2015–2017)
 Drew Cronic (2018–2019)
 Mike Jacobs (2020–)

Notable former players
Notable alumni include:
Kyle Dugger, drafted 37th overall in the 2020 NFL Draft by the New England Patriots
Perry Fewell, former NFL coach
Craig Keith, former tight end for the Pittsburgh Steelers and Jacksonville Jaguars (1993–1995)
John Milem, former defensive end for the Carolina Panthers and San Francisco 49ers (2000–2002)
Terence Steward, former wide receiver for the Dallas Cowboys (1987)
Dareke Young, drafted 233rd overall (7th round) in the 2022 NFL Draft by the Seattle Seahawks

Year-by-year results

Year W-L-T
1907 (0-3),
1908 (5-2-1),
1909 (3-5),
1910 (1-2),
1911 (3-3),
—-NO TEAM 1912-1920—- 
1921 (2-3),
1922 (1-5),
1923 (0-5),
1924 (5-4),
1925 (6-3),
1926 (7-2),
1927 (3-6-1),
1928 (2-6-1),
1929 (4-5-1),
1930 (3-6-1),

1939* (6–1–3), 1951 (10–1), 1952 (8–1), 1955 (9–0–1), 1956 (10–0), 1958 (9–1), 1959 (10–1), 1960 (12–0), 1961 (8–1–1), 1962 (11–1), 1965 (7–3), 1966* (6–3), 1967 (8–1), 1975 (7–3–1), 1988* (7–4), 1994* (8–2), 2005 (5–5), 2006 (3–8), 2007 (2–9), 2008 (3–8), 2009 (5–6), 2010 (7–4), 2011* (7–3), 2012 (9–3), 2013* (13–2), 2014* (11–1), 2015 (5–5), 2016 (3–8), 2017 (3–7), 2018* (12–2), 2019* (13–1), Spring 2020 (3-1)

Championship appearances
The Bears made three appearances in the NAIA championship game during their tenure, winning in 1960, and appeared in the NCAA Division II championship game in 2013.

Conference championships
1939* (6–1–3), 1951 (10–1), 1952 (8–1), 1955 (9–0–1), 1956 (10–0), 1958 (9–1), 1959 (10–1), 1960 (12–0), 1961 (8–1–1), 1962 (11–1), 1965 (7–3), 1966* (6–3), 1967 (8–1), 1975 (7–3–1), 1988* (7–4), 1994* (8–2), 2011* (7–3), 2012 (9–3), 2013 (13–2), 2014 (11–1), 2018 (12–2), 2019 (13–1)

*denotes co-championship. The Bears won 8 titles in the North State Conference, 5 in the Carolinas Conference, and 9 in the South Atlantic Conference.

References

External links
 

 
American football teams established in 1907
1907 establishments in North Carolina